Andrew Levin may refer to:

Andrew T. Levin, American economist 
Andy Levin (born 1960), American politician

See also
Andres Levin, Venezuelan-American musician
Andrey Levin (born 1982), Russian media producer
A+ (rapper) (Andre Levins, born 1982), American hip-hop artist